This is a list of people from Fresno, California.

A
Ron Adams – former basketball coach at Fresno State, NBA assistant coach of Golden State Warriors
Armen Alchian – economist
Jenifer Alcorn – professional boxer
Courtney Alexander – former NBA player, Dallas Mavericks
Rafer Alston – former NBA player, Orlando Magic
Charles Amirkhanian – composer
Ron Anderson – former NBA player, Cleveland Cavs
Jeff Atmajian – Hollywood orchestrator
Phil Austin – writer, actor, The Firesign Theatre 
Alan Autry – actor, former mayor of Fresno
Brad Avakian – politician and senator

B
Baeza – rapper 
Ross Bagdasarian, Sr. – actor, singer, musician
Stephen Baker – former NFL player, New York Giants
Robert Beltran – actor, Star Trek: Voyager
Bob Bennett – former head baseball coach at Fresno State
Don Bennett – Alaska state politician
Laura Berg – Olympic gold medalist softball player
Ewell Blackwell – six-time MLB All-Star pitcher
Heidi Blickenstaff – actor
Deborah Blum – writer for the Fresno Bee, Pulitzer Prize winner
DeWitt Bodeen – screenwriter
Tommy Bond – child actor in Our Gang (Little Rascals) series
Bobby Bonds – former Fresno Giants player, 3-time MLB All-Star
Frenchy Bordagaray – MLB baseball player
Bruce Bowen – former NBA player, San Antonio Spurs
Johnny Boyd – AAA and USAC Champ Car driver
Gregory "Pappy" Boyington – World War II ace, retired in Fresno
Ernest K. Bramblett – politician
Lee Brand – mayor of Fresno
John Brascia – actor and dancer
Tyler Bray – NFL quarterback, Kansas City Chief

C
Brian Cage – professional wrestler, TNA Impact, AEW
Ernie C – musician, guitarist for the rock group Body Count
David Carr – former NFL player, Houston Texans
Derek Carr – NFL player,former Las Vegas Raiders
Frank Chance – Baseball Hall of Famer
Luke Chueh – artist
Andrew Christian - underwear designer
Chris Colfer – actor, Kurt Hummel on TV series Glee
Lorraine Collett – Sun-Maid Raisin Girl
Mike Connors (aka Krekor Ohanian) – actor, Mannix
Victor Conte – BALCO founder
Dick Contino – musician, accordionist
Ryan Cook – MLB pitcher, Oakland A's
Terry Cooney – former MLB umpire
Joe Cooper – NFL player
William John Cooper – served as U.S. Commissioner of Education, 1929–33
Young Corbett III – professional boxer
Jim Costa – U.S. House of Representatives
Bobby Cox – former MLB player, retired Hall of Fame manager, Atlanta Braves
Ron Cox – NFL player
Phil Cristian – musician, Cheap Trick
Dwayne Crump – former NFL player, St. Louis Cardinals
Tyrone Culver – Miami Dolphins NFL player
Pat Corrales – former MLB player, and manager

D

Lucius Davis (born 1970) – basketball player 
Bison Dele (born Brian Williams) – former NBA player, Los Angeles Clippers
Trent Dilfer – former NFL quarterback of Super Bowl champion Baltimore Ravens, Monday Night Football commentator
Maynard Dixon – 20th-century American artist whose body of work focused on the American West
Derek Henderson – pro rollerblader Razors Skate Co

E
Henry Ellard – former Los Angeles Rams wide receiver, former NFL coach 
Dick Ellsworth – former MLB pitcher
Melvin Ely – former NBA player, LA Clippers
John Erickson – former professional golfer
Johnny Estrada – MLB player
William Everson – poet
Dana Ewell – convicted triple murderer

F
Fashawn – rapper
Kevin Federline – ex-husband of Britney Spears
Freddy Fender – singer, songwriter
Andy Finch – member of Olympic snowboarding team
Tom Flores – former NFL quarterback, former Oakland Raiders head coach, NFL Hall of Fame member
Mac Foster – professional boxer
Farrah Franklin – singer, model, former member of Destiny's Child
Jethro Franklin – former NFL player, Seattle Seahawks; assistant coach, Oakland Raiders
Zoila Frausto Gurgel – MMA fighter, Bellator women's flyweight world champion
Mike Freeman – former NFL player, Atlanta Falcons

G
Patrick K. Gamble - educator and United States Army officer
Mark Gardner – former MLB pitcher, coach for San Francisco Giants
Matt Garza – Milwaukee Brewers MLB pitcher
Blackie Gejeian – race car driver and designer
Paul George – NBA All-Star player, Los Angeles Clippers
Matt Giordano – Indianapolis Colts NFL safety
Bill Glasson – former PGA Tour golfer
Bob Glazebrook – former NFL player, Atlanta Falcons
Gene Gomes – California state judge
Tom Goodwin – former MLB player
Christopher Gorham – actor
Keith Gooch – former CFL football player
Jalen Green – NBA player, Houston Rockets
Ed Gregory – former head basketball coach at Fresno State, Golden State Warriors
Kenny Guinn – Governor of Nevada

H
Sid Haig – actor
Millard Hampton – former Olympian
Brandon Hancock – former USC fullback, fitness expert
Victor Davis Hanson – scholar, historian, author
David Harris – Vietnam War draft resistance leader
Chris Herren – former NBA player
Pat Hill – former head football coach at Fresno State
Jaime Hipp – former Olympian
John Hoover – former MLB pitcher
Steve Hosey – MLB player
Pat Howell – former NFL player, Atlanta Falcons
Rex Hudler – former MLB player, broadcaster

I
Debora Iyall – singer of the 80s group Romeo Void

J
Vestee Jackson – former NFL player, Super Bowl champion Chicago Bears 
Chris Jefferies – former pro basketball player
Adam Jennings – NFL player
Keshon Johnson – NFL player
Rafer Johnson – 1960 Olympic gold medalist, decathlon
Bill Jones – California Secretary of State
Bobby Jones – former MLB pitcher, NY Mets
Gary Jules – singer-songwriter

K
Robert Kendrick – former professional tennis player, at one time was ranked #69 in the world
Mychal Kendricks – NFL linebacker, Philadelphia Eagles
Eric Kendricks – NFL linebacker, Minnesota Vikings
Kirk Kerkorian – billionaire businessman; owned Metro-Goldwyn-Mayer, MGM Grand Hotel and Casino
Joanna Kerns – actress, Growing Pains
Richard Kiel – actor, James Bond films
Josh Koscheck – UFC mixed martial artist
Emily Kuroda – actress, Gilmore Girls

L
Daryle Lamonica – former NFL All-Pro quarterback, Oakland Raiders
Jim Landis – former outfielder, Chicago White Sox
Claude "Pop" Laval – photographer, historian
Steven Anthony Lawrence – actor
Sharon Leal – actor, Dreamgirls
Philip Levine – poet
Larry Levis – poet
David Little – former NFL player, Philadelphia Eagles
Hector Lizarraga – professional boxer
Brook Lopez – NBA player
Robin Lopez – NBA player

M
Jim Maloney – former MLB pitcher, Cincinnati Reds
Ricky Manning, Jr. – former NFL defensive back, Carolina Panthers
J. P. Manoux – actor
Richard Marshall – former NFL player, San Diego Chargers
Ryan Mathews – NFL running back, Philadelphia Eagles
Bob Mathias – Olympic gold medal decathlete, former congressman; retired in Fresno
Miranda Rae Mayo – actress
Chad McCarty – former Olympian
Marcus McCauley – NFL player
Kevin F. McCready – contributor to anti-psychiatry movement
Aari McDonald – WNBA player for the Atlanta Dream
Audra McDonald – Tony Award-winning Broadway actress, singer
Tim McDonald – former NFL player, San Francisco 49ers, coach
T.J. McDonald – former NFL player, Los Angeles Rams
Barry McGuire – rock and folk singer-songwriter
Chris McNealy – former NBA player, New York Knicks
Jim Merlo – former NFL player, New Orleans Saints
Rick Merlo – former Olympian
Dale Messer – former NFL player, San Francisco 49ers
Barbara Morgan – astronaut, educator
Larry Mucker – former NFL player, Tampa Bay Buccaneers
Barlow Der Mugrdechian – historian and lecturer on Armenian studies

N
Michael Najarian – relationship and communication expert
Armen Nalbandian – musician, composer
Lorenzo Neal – former NFL fullback, San Diego Chargers

P
Bob Padilla – former football head coach at Fresno State, and NFL Detroit Lions
Stephone Paige – former NFL player, Kansas City Chiefs
Carson Palmer – NFL quarterback, Arizona Cardinals
Vang Pao – Laotian general
Lou Pardini – Grammy-nominated keyboardist, songwriter and vocalist; member of the rock band Chicago
Maxie Parks – Olympic gold medalist
Chip Pashayan – lawyer and Republican Congressman
Sam Peckinpah – film director and screenwriter, best known for The Wild Bunch
Justin Peelle – former tight end who is currently the tight ends coach for the Atlanta Falcons
Rod Perry – former NFL player, Los Angeles Rams; assistant coach, Oregon State
David Phillips – entrepreneur; aka "The Pudding Guy"
Slim Pickens – actor (born in Kingsburg, Fresno County) 
Planet Asia – rapper
Cliff Pondexter – former NBA player, Chicago Bulls
Quincy Pondexter – NBA player, New Orleans Pelicans
Chuck Poochigian – California State Senator
Keith Poole – former NFL player, New Orleans Saints
Marquez Pope – former NFL player, San Francisco 49ers
James Porteous – inventor of the Fresno Scraper
Hal Haig Prieste – Armenian-American athlete and world's oldest former Olympic medalist

R
Radagun – musical group, began in Fresno
Stewart Rhodes – founding member of the Oath Keepers
Les Richter – former NFL player, Los Angeles Rams, Pro Football Hall of Fame inductee; former Sr. Vice President of NASCAR; former president of the Riverside International Raceway
Darryl Rogers – former head coach of Fresno State, San Jose State, Detroit Lions
Phil Roman – animator, founder of Film Roman
Nicole Row – bassist, vocals, Panic! At The Disco
Chester Harvey Rowell – journalist, Lincoln-Roosevelt League co-founder
Aaron Ruell – actor, Napoleon Dynamite
Johnny Russell – country western singer-songwriter

S
Todd Santos – former NFL player, San Francisco 49ers
William Saroyan – Pulitzer Prize and Oscar-winning playwright, novelist
John Scalzi – Hugo Award-winning science fiction author
Gary Scelzi – NHRA champion
Kate Scott – sportscaster
Tom Seaver – MLB Hall of Fame pitcher, 3-time Cy Young Award winner; NY Mets, Cincinnati Reds
Dick Selma – former MLB pitcher, Philadelphia Phillies
Juan Serrano – flamenco guitarist
David Seville, aka Ross Bagdasarian – songwriter, recording artist
Frank Hamilton Short – lawyer, Conservation movement
Kelly Skipper – NFL assistant coach for Buffalo Bills
John Sontag – train robber, died in Fresno jail in 1893 and interred at Calvary Cemetery there
Gary Soto – author, poet
Dennis Springer – former MLB knuckleball pitcher for the Los Angeles Dodgers
Sloane Stephens – tennis player, US Open champion
Richard Martin Stern – author
DeShawn Stevenson – NBA player, Atlanta Hawks
Mike Stewart – former NFL safety, Los Angeles Rams
Randy Stumpfhauser – BMX pro and four-time world champion
William A. Sutherland – lawyer, author, politician
Ashley Swearengin – former Mayor of Fresno
Jim Sweeney – former head football coach at Fresno State
Kevin Sweeney – former NFL player, Dallas Cowboys

T
Timmy T – singer of the multi-platinum hit song "One More Try"
Tim Thackrey – former taekwondo athlete, US National Team, Pan Am Games Champion, Olympic Coach
Jerry Tarkanian – former head basketball coach at Fresno State, UNLV, San Antonio Spurs NBA
Bernard Thompson – former NBA player, Portland Blazers
Brian Turner – poet

V
Billy Volek – former NFL quarterback, Tennessee Titans
Jason Von Flue – Ultimate Fighter season 2 reality show, UFC veteran 
Bill Vukovich – two-time Indianapolis 500 Winner

W
Marcus Walden – pitcher for the Milwaukee Brewers
Mykal Walker – linebacker for the Atlanta Falcons
Anthony Washington – NFL defensive back, Washington Redskins
Tim Washington – NFL defensive back, San Francisco 49ers
Heidi Watney – Boston Red Sox reporter for NESN
Nick Watney – PGA Tour golfer
Gary Weaver – NFL player, Oakland Raiders
Del Webb – real estate developer, former owner of New York Yankees
Marcus Wesson – convicted murderer
Frederick C. Weyand – former U.S. Army Chief of Staff (1974-1976) and member of the Joint Chiefs of Staff
Flex Wheeler – bodybuilder
Michael Willett – singer, Shane on  MTV's Faking It
J.D. Williams – NFL player, Buffalo Bills, assistant coach at Georgia State
Marquice Williams – special teams coordinator for the Atlanta Falcons 
Randy Williams – Olympic gold medalist in the long jump
Susan Montgomery Williams – world record holder for the largest bubble gum bubble
Tony Woodruff – NFL player, Philadelphia Eagles
Ickey Woods – NFL player, Cincinnati Bengals running back
Cameron Worrell – NFL player, Chicago Bears

Y
Conrad Yama – actor
Steve Yarbrough – writer
Charles Young – former NFL All-Pro tight end, San Francisco 49ers

Z
Steve Zaillian – Oscar-winning screenwriter  
Gus Zernial – former MLB player, Philadelphia Athletics
Warren Zevon – singer-songwriter, "Werewolves of London"

References

Fresno, California
 
Fresno